Winslow railway station refers to either one of two railway stations which historically served or is planned to serve, the town of Winslow in north Buckinghamshire, England. , construction of a new station nears completion and is scheduled to be served by East West Rail, as part of the plan to reinstate the OxfordCambridge service.

First station

Early days
The line was worked from the outset by the London and North Western Railway (LNWR) which absorbed the Buckinghamshire Railway in 1879. Winslow station was centrally situated at the end of Station Road which branches off from the High Street, serving Winslow, which comprised 1,805 inhabitants at the time. The coming of the railway had a significant impact on the village, resulting in its northward extension and the opening of a "Railway Inn".

Passenger facilities were provided on each platform which were more generous than those found elsewhere on the line. A stationhouse was also provided for the stationmaster and this was situated just beyond the main station building and arranged around a circular driveway at the centre of which was a large horse chestnut tree. A coal yard lay to the east of the station, while a goods yard was provided to the west. Winslow Gasworks opened in 1880 on a site immediately to the south of the coal yard; it received up to 1000 tons of coal annually via the yard, although it was not rail-connected. The station was lit by gas until the trains cease to call.

A typical LNWR goods shed was constructed in the goods yard and contained a crane with a 5-ton capacity. Like Bicester, Winslow had its own signal box with 34 levers which controlled the section between Verney Junction and Bletchley No. 1 box. Two water columns - the only ones between Bletchley and Oxford - supplied water to locomotives, these tanks taking their supply from a large  iron water tower which pumped water from a nearby brook. The columns, which had been manufactured by Edward Bury, may have pre-dated the station itself. Beneath the water tower was a brick engine house and boiler room which also served as accommodation for an LNWR engine driver. Until 1907 there was a long refuge siding trailing off the Up main line behind the Up platform which allowed freight trains stopping to take water to allow a following passenger train to pass. A second siding from the Up main line further to the west led to a turntable; this had been removed by 1925. Three further sidings trailed from the Down line; two for coal and one serving a separate side end loading dock for horses. A final siding served a milk dock at the rear of the Up platform.

Closure

In the wake of the abandonment of a plan to develop the Varsity Line as a freight link from the East Coast ports to South Wales, including a marshalling yard near , Winslow station was listed for closure in the Beeching report which called for the closure of all minor stations on the line. This followed the introduction of diesel trains in an attempt to reduce operating costs after a failed proposal to close the line, which had been put forward in 1959 but successfully resisted by local authorities. With the line's expenses amounting to £199,700 against a revenue of £102,200 in 1964, Winslow duly closed to goods traffic on 22 May 1967 and to passengers on 1 January 1968; the signal box followed one month later. The delay in closure was the result of replacement bus services not being able to handle the projected extra traffic. The line between Oxford and Bletchley was closed to passengers and local goods services, and later singled in 1985.

Winslow station continued to be used during the 1980s for "Chiltern Shopper" specials and British Rail handbills survive which show that services called at the station during November and December between 1984 and 1986. The station building, which was by then in a very derelict state, survived long enough to see the first visit of a Class 43 on 13 February 1993, but was demolished very shortly afterwards. The last train over the section was a Class 56 railtour called "The Mothball" which ran on 29 May 1993 from Waterloo to Bletchley via Winslow. Winslow station site was later developed for housing,  (Comerford Way and McLernon Way).

New station
 

, a new station is being built for Winslow as part of the East West Rail project which is to reestablish the route between Oxford and Cambridge; building completion is anticipated in Summer 2023.

The new station is located at the western outskirts of the town, at the junction of Buckingham Road (A413) with Horwood Road (B4033) at grid reference . Groundworks began on the site in Summer 2021, with drainage improvements and reshaping of the cutting. 

When the line opens, Winslow will have direct trains to Oxford, Milton Keynes Central and Bedford. The journey time from Winslow to Oxford is estimated at 27 minutes.

Aylesbury connection
In March 2021, the East West Rail Company announced that its opening plans for East West Rail have changed, notably deferring indefinitely a connection to Aylesbury.

Services summary

References

Notes

Sources

External links
Disused Stations: Winslow

Disused railway stations in Buckinghamshire
Former London and North Western Railway stations
Railway stations in Great Britain opened in 1850
Railway stations in Great Britain closed in 1968
Beeching closures in England
Proposed railway stations in England
Winslow, Buckinghamshire
East West Rail